Caeciliusinae is a subfamily of Psocoptera from the Caeciliusidae family.

Tribes 

 Austrocaeciliini Yoshizawa, 2001
 Bassocaeciliini Schmidt & New, 2008
 Caeciliusini Mockford, 2000
 Coryphacini Mockford, 2000
 Epicaeciliini Mockford, 2000
 Maoripsocini Mockford, 2000

References 

Caeciliusidae
Insects described in 2000
Insect subfamilies